Muhammad Ramzan Ali (born 13 December 1932) is a Pakistani former athlete who competed in track and field events.

Ali represented Pakistan in both the long and triple jumps at the 1956 Summer Olympics.

In 1958, he won Asian Games bronze medals in the 4 x 100 metres relay and long jump, as well as a bronze medal in the long jump at the British Commonwealth Games in Cardiff.

At the 1960 Summer Olympics, Ali again represented Pakistan in the long jump and was also a member of their 4x 100 metres relay team.

His personal best in the long jump, 7.43m, was set in 1960.

References

External links
Muhammad Ramzan Ali at Sports Reference

1932 births
Living people
Pakistani male sprinters
Pakistani male long jumpers
Pakistani male triple jumpers
Olympic athletes of Pakistan
Athletes (track and field) at the 1956 Summer Olympics
Athletes (track and field) at the 1960 Summer Olympics
Asian Games bronze medalists for Pakistan
Asian Games medalists in athletics (track and field)
Athletes (track and field) at the 1958 Asian Games
Athletes (track and field) at the 1958 British Empire and Commonwealth Games
Commonwealth Games bronze medallists for Pakistan
Commonwealth Games medallists in athletics
Sportspeople from Ludhiana
Athletes from Punjab, India
Medalists at the 1958 Asian Games
20th-century Pakistani people
Medallists at the 1958 British Empire and Commonwealth Games